This is a list of FSILGs, or fraternities, sororities, and independent living groups (ILGs) at the Massachusetts Institute of Technology.

MIT's Greek system

The first, or pioneer fraternity on the campus of the Massachusetts Institute of Technology (MIT) campus was Chi Phi, established in 1873. However many of the early professors and deans of the Institute held fraternity memberships from their own collegiate days, as by the time Chi Phi at MIT had appeared fraternities had already been thriving at America's earliest campuses for almost 100 years.

As of 2020, MIT hosts 29 academic fraternities, 10 academic sororities, 12 national or local honors societies and recognition organizations, 2 professional societies, 5 Independent Living Groups, and 1 service- or religious-focused chapter.

Within this article, the terms "Fraternity" and "Sorority" are used somewhat interchangeably, with men's and co-ed groups normally using Fraternity, and women's groups using either Fraternity or Sorority. For convenience, the term "Greek Letter Society" is a generic substitute. The word "Greek" in this case refers to the use of Greek Letters for each society's name, and not to Greek ethnicity. For brevity, the sections below make extensive use of Greek letters, one of the first items in a new member's instruction program. Most fraternities use two or three Greek letters to signify their symbolic or secret names; a few use non-Greek words. The main listing for each fraternity or sorority shows their full name at least once, with references and Wikilinks as available.

History
Many MIT fraternities are located in Boston because the Institute was originally located in the Back Bay neighborhood, and had no dormitories to house its students. The fraternities and various dining clubs met a need for room and board that was not provided by the operations of the campus. Fraternity housing has continued to expand, both in terms of the size and quality of the individual buildings as well as the number of chapters. In 1900 the percentage of fraternity men at "Technology", as was the name of the school at that time, was 16.1%; today the percentage is almost 50% of men, and 30% of women. Several of MIT's fraternity buildings are today listed on the National Register of Historic Places or are otherwise notable. These include former governors mansions, college deans mansions, and homes of various early leaders who once resided there. Quality facilities remain a focus for many groups. A cursory search of Institute yearbooks will show that dining, and later, fine dining, has remained of particular interest to participants. Many chapters and ILGs extol the quality of their gourmet or commercial kitchens in their photo tours and rush materials. 

MIT moved to its Cambridge campus in 1916, and newer independent living groups have sprouted up or moved in around it. Many early chapters had been situated along Newbury Street, convenient to the old campus, but because of the move, today, MIT doesn't have a specific Greek Row; instead, chapters are scattered on both sides of the Charles River in Boston, Cambridge and the surrounding towns. 1916 also saw the emergence of the campus Inter-fraternity Conference. Its responsibilities included coordination of recruitment (rush), intramural Greek athletics such as baseball and bowling, among other competitions. One early tradition established by the IFC with support of 'Tech faculty was a trophy for the best scholarship record. This handsome grandfather clock would be passed on to the chapter with the best overall grade average at the completion of each term.

The MIT yearbook, The Technique, has provided a window to the growth and popularity of MIT's Greek organizations for almost 150 years. Early editions are available online.

Demographic change
From the 1860s through WWII, MIT students were almost entirely male, thus the formation of women's fraternities (~sororities) came about rather late, in comparison. By the 2000s, the Institute's undergraduate gender ratio reached near parity. En route to this more balanced, modern phase, a period of demographic and political change in the 1960s and 1970s, following larger national trends, resulted in the conversion of several all-male, nationally affiliated living groups into local co-ed groups, and led to the expansion of all-female and co-ed housing options. Most of the resultant fraternities, sororities and independent living groups are coordinated through the Office of Fraternities, Sororities and Independent Living Groups (FSILGs), though some independent "MIT-area" chapters do arise from time to time, along with those that serve students from multiple schools in Boston and the surrounding cities.

Recruitment traditions
Traditionally, rush at MIT occurred during Residence/Orientation (R/O) Week, which was the final week of each summer before the start of the fall semester. All incoming freshmen and transfer students would arrive on campus a week before Registration Day, the official start of the fall semester. During R/O Week, the incoming class would participate in orientation activities, take the so-called writing test to attempt to test out of the MIT Writing Requirement, and participate in residence selection. All students were free to participate in the fraternity, sorority, and independent living group rush. Those students who did not end up in an off-campus living group would also participate in the dorm selection process (see Housing at the Massachusetts Institute of Technology).

New rush system
The old rush system was supported behind the scenes by the 24-hour week-long "R/O Clearinghouse", a system for keeping track of freshman students as they threaded their way through a maze of fraternity rush events interleaved with other MIT orientation activities. Whenever a freshman checked into or checked out of a fraternity activity, that frat's R/O liaison person was supposed to call the R/O Clearinghouse to update what was essentially a real-time database to track the whereabouts of the new students. R/O Clearinghouse physically consisted of a bank of telephones staffed by volunteers in a large room equipped with computer terminals, located in the MIT EECS Department. The volunteers were drawn from MIT service fraternities and dorm residents who were supposed to be impartial with respect to the different competing fraternities. The dorm volunteers were motivated at least in part by the knowledge that an unsuccessful fraternity rush would result in even greater overcrowding of the MIT dormitory system. which simply lacked the physical space to accommodate every new student.

Freshman housing rush was eliminated in an initiative led by MIT president Charles Vest in the wake of the September 1997 death of Phi Gamma Delta (Fiji) freshman Scott Krueger. Beginning with the 2002–2003 academic year, all freshmen were required to live on campus. This was made possible by the completion of a new undergraduate dorm which opened that year, Simmons Hall. Since then, MIT has continued to build or renovate more dormitories, including an expansion of choices for graduate students as well (see Housing at the Massachusetts Institute of Technology#Graduate dorms).

A much-toned-down echo of the old rush still occurs with the so-called dormitory rush process, in which new students decide their dormitory preferences, based in part upon special events staged by various dorms to introduce newcomers to their distinctive living arrangements. However, dormitories do not choose which new students to admit, but can only influence prospective new members to express a greater or lesser preference for specific dorms on their respective entries in the dorm lottery process. The pressure to quickly find housing has been lifted by MIT's guarantees that every freshman student will find space in an on-campus dorm and that undergraduate students can remain in the dorm system for up to 4 years. The old fraternity rush has been depressurized, with recruiting spread out throughout the first academic year, and less-frantic rush events for prospective new members.

Fraternities
Fraternities constituting the Interfraternity Council (IFC) are listed by dates of local founding and noted with national conference membership. These are (with several exceptions) men's organizations, voluntarily coordinating their efforts within the IFC as a self-governing body. Almost 50% of campus men participate in one of these chapters.

As part of IFC or national organization self-governance or University disciplinary action, chapters may be suspended (de-recognized) or closed for a time. For consistency, if a chapter is closed and/or forfeits its housing, it will be listed here as a dormant chapter, italicized, while active chapters or those suspended for a brief time are in bold. See the Office for Fraternities, Sororities and Independent Living Groups (FSILGs) for current IFC members and for expansion support.

Gallery of fraternities

Active Fraternity Chapters

  - Chi Phi, 1873-1878, 1890 (NIC)
  - Sigma Chi, 1882 (NIC)
  - Theta Xi, 1885-1897, 1901 (NIC)
  - Delta Psi / Number Six Club, 1889 (NIC), co-ed
  - Delta Tau Delta, 1889 (NIC)
  - Theta Delta Chi, 1890-1892, 1906 (NIC)
  - Phi Beta Epsilon (local), 1890
  - Delta Kappa Epsilon, 1890 (NIC)
  - Sigma Alpha Epsilon, 1892-1999, 2009 (NIC)
  - Pi Lambda Phi, 1897-1901, 1920 (NIC)

  - Phi Sigma Kappa, 1902 (NIC)
  - Theta Chi, 1902 (NIC)
  - Phi Kappa Sigma, 1903 (NIC)
  - Zeta Beta Tau, 1911–22, 1961 (NIC)
  - Theta Tau, 1912-1930, 2016 (PFA)
  - Beta Theta Pi, 1913-2011, 2013 (NIC)
  - Kappa Sigma, 1914
  - Phi Kappa Theta, 1918 (NIC)
  - Tau Epsilon Phi, 1919-1930, 1957 (NIC), co-ed
  - Sigma Nu, 1922-1974, 1995 (NIC)

  - Phi Delta Theta, 1932
  - Alpha Epsilon Pi, 1951-1990, 1990 (NIC)
  - Sigma Phi Epsilon, 1952
  - Kappa Alpha Psi, 1975 (NPHC) and (NIC)
  - Alpha Delta Phi, 1976 (NIC)
  - Nu Delta (local), 1977
  - Zeta Psi, 1979 (NIC)
  - Alpha Phi Alpha, 1989 (NPHC) and (NIC)
  - Phi Sigma Rho Colony, 2016 women's

Chapters whose names changed

 Navajo Club (local), 1878-1890, interim group that became 
 Number 6 Club (local), 1887-1889, became 
  - Alpha Epsilon (local), 1902–1906, became 
  - Lambda Phi (local), 1906-1925, inspired 
  - Kappa Theta (local), 1908-1913, became 
  - Delta Kappa Phi (local), 1912-1914, became 
  - Sigma Alpha Mu, 1917-1973 (NIC), became Fenway House
  - Phi Kappa, 1918-1959, became 
  - Phi Beta Delta, 1920–1941, Jewish, (see )
  - Phi Sigma Delta, 1921-1927, Jewish, (see )
 Sigma Nu Club (local), 1921-1922, became 
  - Phi Mu Delta (NIC), 1922-1977, became 
  - Psi Delta (local), 1922-1932, became 
  - Sigma Omega Psi, 1922–1935?, Jewish, became 
 Alpha Club (local), 1929-1929, became ΑΚΠ (see ΑΣΦ) 
  - Alpha Kappa Pi, 1929-1940, became ΑΣΦ 
 Pegis Club (local), 1948-1952, became 

 Dover Club (local), 1956-1961, became 
  - Pi Kappa Alpha, 1970-1981, 2010-11 (NIC), became pika
  - Delta Pi (local), 1990-1995, became 
Dormant Chapters

  - Alpha Tau Omega, 1885-1887, 1905-2009 (NIC), dormant
  - Phi Gamma Delta (FIJI), 1889-1894, 1899-1998 (NIC), dormant
  - Delta Upsilon, 1891-2014 (NIC), dormant
  - Delta Sigma (local), 1894-1898, dormant
  - Delta Sigma Phi, 1904-1908 (NIC), dormant
  - Theta Nu Epsilon, 1904-1916 (NIC), dormant
  - Lambda Chi Alpha, 1912-2014, dormant
  - Tau Delta Phi, 1919-1929, 194x-1991+/- (NIC), Jewish, dormant
  - Alpha Mu Sigma, 1921-1926, Jewish, dormant
  - Alpha Phi Delta, 1928-37, 1939-43, 1948-53 (NIC), Italian-American, dormant
  - Alpha Sigma Phi, 1929-1940, 2012-2014 (NIC), dormant

Sororities

Sororities, listed with dates of local founding and national conference membership, are women's organizations, voluntarily coordinating their efforts within MIT's Panhellenic Association (PHA). For convenience, the term "sorority" is used throughout, though some of these organizations are "women's Fraternities," and were so named prior to the popularization of the term sorority. The terms are synonymous. Over 30% of campus women participate in one of these chapters.

Sorority properties are generally owned or leased by a chapter's alumni club, though some chapters do not have housing. As part of PHA or national organization self-governance, or University disciplinary action, chapters may be suspended (de-recognized) or closed for a time. If a chapter is closed and/or forfeits its housing, it will be listed as a dormant chapter. See the office for Fraternities, Sororities and Independent Living Groups (FSILGs) for current PHA members and for expansion support.

(NPC) indicates members of the National Panhellenic Conference
(NPHC) indicates members of the National Pan-Hellenic Council

Active Chapters

MIT Panhellenic Association

  - Alpha Phi, 1984 (NPC)
  - Alpha Chi Omega, 1986 (NPC)
  - Sigma Kappa, 1989 (NPC)
  - Kappa Alpha Theta, 1991 (NPC)
  - Alpha Epsilon Phi, 1995 (NPC)
  - Pi Beta Phi, 2008 (NPC)
  - Delta Phi Epsilon, 2015 (NPC)

MIT Sororities, Multicultural Greek Council
These organizations serve MIT students as members of the MGC.
  - Alpha Kappa Alpha, 1977 (NPHC)
  - Delta Sigma Theta, 1980 (NPHC)

MIT-Area Sororities, outside of the FSILG
  - Chi Lambda Mu / Clam, 2014 co-ed

Sororities whose names changed

  - Eta Sigma Mu (local), 1890-1895, became The Cleofan.
 Bon 3 Club (local), 1968-2014, became 
 Club Amherst (local), 1981-1984, became 
 The Thalians (local), 1985-1986, became 
  - Sigma Iota Phi (local), 1992-1995, became 

Dormant sorority chapters
 -None-

Independent Living Groups (ILGs)

MIT's Independent Living Groups or ILGs participate in some of the broader Greek events, but maintain many of their own traditions as cooperative homes. Some developed as former fraternities that left their national associations during the early 1970s as part of a move toward co-education which was not compatible with their national organizations. MIT's five ILGs coordinate themselves through a separate Living Group Council (LGC).

Each ILG property is owned by a corporation populated mainly or entirely by alums, and then leased to residents.

Active ILG Houses
 Student House, 1930 co-ed
 Fenway House, 1973 co-ed
  - Epsilon Theta, 1974 co-ed
 Women's Independent Living Group (WILG), 1976
 pika, 1981 co-ed

Dormant ILGs
 5:15 Club, 1933-1986

Multicultural Greek Council (MGC)

Originally ethnic or language-affiliated, these organizations are now fully integrated – as are MIT's general Greek letter organizations and ILGs. They make up the fourth Greek Council within FSILG. Their historical affiliation may be reviewed by reading their local or national histories. Some of the men's groups also participate in IFC events, and the women's groups in PHA events.

MGC chapters are non-residential and often serve several schools in the Boston area. Additional schools are listed in the references for each group. They may or may not be under the authority of the Office of FSILG. Further, the historically Black Greek associations (NPHC and NPC) have adopted a heightened focus on alumni and adult programming, usually with distinct alumni chapters that also exist locally. On the MIT campus, the inter-Greek councils will, as needed, cooperate on programs and policies, as do individual chapters from among the several Greek councils.

Listed by date of local founding and national conference membership, these are either men's or women's organizations, voluntarily coordinating their efforts within the larger Multicultural Greek Council (MGC). See the FLILG office for current MGC chapters.

Active Men's NPHC or NALFO chapters
  - Kappa Alpha Psi, 1975 (NPHC) and (NIC)
  - Alpha Phi Alpha, 1989 (NPHC) and (NIC)

Active Men's NPHC or NALFO chapters outside of FSILG
  - Lambda Upsilon Lambda, 1994 (NALFO), Latino

Dormant Historically Ethnic Men's chapters
  - Psi Alpha Kappa, 1901-1904, Latin American, dormant
  - Pi Delta Phi (local), 1916-1921, Latin-American, became ΦΛΑ (see ΦΙΑ)
  - Phi Lambda Alpha, 1921-1931?, Latin-American, became ΦΙΑ

Active Women's NPHC or NAPA chapters
  - Alpha Kappa Alpha, 1977 (NPC)
  - Delta Sigma Theta, 1980 (NPC)
Dormant Historically Ethnic Women's chapters
-None-

Professional fraternities
Professional societies work to build friendship bonds among members, cultivate their strengths that they may promote their profession, and provide mutual assistance in their shared areas of professional study.

Listed by date of local founding with national conference membership, these are primarily co-ed organizations, of a specific professional interests. Membership in a professional fraternity may be the result of a pledge process, much like a social fraternity, and members are expected to remain loyal and active in the organization for life. Within the group of societies dedicated to professional fields of study, for example, law societies, membership is exclusive; however, these societies may initiate members who belong to other types of fraternities. Professional Societies are known for networking and post-collegiate involvement. Governance varies from faculty-managed to purely student run.
(PFA) indicates members of the Professional Fraternity Association.
  - Theta Tau, 1912 (PFA), engineering
Dormant Professional Fraternities
  - Alpha Chi Sigma, 1919-1954, 19xx-2009 (PFA), chemistry, dormant
 Scarab, 1921, architecture, national disbanded.
  - Kappa Eta Kappa, 1924-1944 (PFA), electrical engineering, computer engineering or computer science, dormant
Others? Numerous professional societies could be listed here, some have/had a long history on campus.

Honor and recognition fraternities

Honor societies recognize students who excel academically or as leaders among their peers, usually within a specific academic discipline. Members commonly include the society on their résumé/CV, which may serve to bolster grad school acceptance, publishing merit, and professional opportunities.

Listed by date of local founding with national conference membership, these are co-ed, non-residential, achievement-based organizations that self-select members based on published criteria.

At graduation, or at times of formal academic processionals, graduates, administrators, Ph.D. holders, and post-doctoral fellows wear academic robes in the colors of their degree, school, and other distinction, according to a voluntary Intercollegiate Code that governs customs such as formal academic regalia. In addition, various colored devices such as stoles, scarfs, cords, tassels, and medallions are used to indicate membership in a student's honor society; cords and mortarboard tassels are most common. Phi Beta Kappa, the first honor society, locally founded at MIT in 1971, has used  Pink and  Sky blue since its national founding in 1776. Hence, students tapped for ΦΒΚ may wear tassels or other society-approved items, in these colors. Like most schools, MIT allows such regalia for honor society members. Stoles are less common, but they are used by a few honor societies. In academic circles, colors are well-known and follow long-standing protocols. The ACHS website lists the colors for their 68 member organizations, and the Honor society WP page lists others.

Many honor societies invite students to become members based on scholastic rank (the top x% of a class) and/or grade point, either overall, or for classes taken within the discipline for which the honor society provides recognition. In cases where academic achievement would not be an appropriate criterion for membership, other standards are required for membership (such as completion of a particular ceremony or training program). These societies recognize past achievement. Pledging is not required, and new candidates may be immediately inducted into membership after meeting predetermined academic criteria and paying a one-time membership fee. Some require graduate enrollment. Because of their purpose of recognition, most honor societies will have much higher academic achievement requirements for membership than professional societies. It is also common for a scholastic honor society to add a criterion relating to the character of the student. Some honor societies are invitation only while others allow unsolicited applications. Finally, membership in an honor society might be considered exclusive, i.e., a member of such an organization cannot join other honor societies representing the same field. Governance requires a faculty sponsor and each society remains faculty-guided, usually with alumni input.
(ACHS) indicates members of the Association of College Honor Societies.

Active Honor Societies
  - Tau Beta Pi, 1922 (ACHS), engineering honors
 Scabbard and Blade, 1924 (ACHS), military honors
  - Chi Epsilon, 1928 (ACHS), civil engineering honors
  - Sigma Xi, 1934, graduate science and engineering honors
  - Eta Kappa Nu 1939, IEEE affiliation, electrical engineering, computer engineering honors
  - Pi Tau Sigma, 1947 (ACHS), mechanical engineering honors
  - Phi Lambda Upsilon, 1956 (ACHS), chemistry honors
  - Delta Sigma Rho-Tau Kappa Alpha, 1956, forensics honors
  - Sigma Delta Psi, 1966, Disbanded national athletics honorary
  - Phi Beta Kappa, 1971, academic honors

  - Alpha Nu Sigma, 1980?, nuclear energy honors
  - Sigma Pi Sigma, 1983 (ACHS), physics honors
 Arnold Air Society (A-1), 19xx, Air Force cadet honors
 National fraternity key societies - There are dozens of these, scholarship honors
Dormant Honor Societies

  - Pi Delta Epsilon, 1910-1927+, Journalism honors (see the Society for Collegiate Journalists)
 Triglyph, 1921-1927+, Architectural honors
  - Sigma Alpha Beta (local), 1923-19xx, Military honors
  - Alpha Sigma Delta, 1924-1927+, radio communication honors
  - Delta Omega, 1924-1944, public health honors
 Mortar and Ball, 1925-1933+, Coast Artillery honors, dormant
 Angel Flight, 19xx, auxiliary to Arnold Air Society, became Silver Wings
 Order of Omega, 1992-201x, Greek Life leadership honors, dormant?
Others? Numerous local honor societies were formed, some enjoying a long tenure.

Service fraternities
Service fraternities formed with the intent of providing campus and community service. Listed with dates of local founding and national conference membership, if any, these are non-residential organizations. These organizations are self-governed.
  - Alpha Phi Omega, 1936 co-ed

See also

 Map of MIT Fraternities, Sororities and ILGs
 Housing at the Massachusetts Institute of Technology
 MIT's Office for Fraternity, Sorority and Independent Living Groups
 MIT Independent Living Groups (ILGs)
 MIT Interfraternity Council (Fraternities)
 MIT Panhellenic Association (Sororities)

References

Massachusetts Institute of Technology student life
MIT